Kiattisak Udomnak is a Thai actor, singer, and comedian. He is best known in Thailand by his stage name Sena Hoi. He was born on September 22, 1969 in Bangkok Thailand nicknamed Boy. He has one older sister.

Works

Dramatic programming appearances

 K- Hat Dao (1992)
 Wai Nee Mai Mee Break (1993)
 Wah Wun (1994-1995)
 Ngern Ngern Ngern (1997)
 Mai Yor Tor Morasum (1997)
 Cha Lui (1998)
 Thewada Duendin (2001)
 Nang Miao Yom Si (2002)
 Song Phu Ying Yai (2003)
 Prao (2014)
 Atsajan Khun Kru Thewada (2015)
 Thep Thida Pa Congreed (2016)
 Sarawat Maeluk-on (2017)

References

External links
 

Kiattisak Udomnak
Kiattisak Udomnak
Kiattisak Udomnak
Kiattisak Udomnak
1969 births
Living people
Kiattisak Udomnak
Kiattisak Udomnak